Bahnsen is a German surname. Notable people with the surname include:

David L. Bahnsen (born 1974), American portfolio manager, author, and television commentator
Greg Bahnsen (1948–1995), Calvinist philosopher, apologist, and debater
John Bahnsen (born 1934), United States Army general
Julius Bahnsen (1830–1881), German philosopher
Karen Bahnsen (born 1960), American college golf coach and former player
Ken Bahnsen (born 1930), American football player 
Stan Bahnsen (born 1944), Major League Baseball pitcher
Uwe Bahnsen (1930–2013), German car designer

German-language surnames